VR Baseball '97 is a baseball video game developed by VR Sports and published by Interplay for PlayStation. It was released in early April 1997, and was later ported for Microsoft Windows as VR Baseball: Hardware Accelerated in late 1997.

Reception

VR Baseball '97 received mixed reviews. Next Generation said, "while VR Baseball '97 has most of the pieces in place to be a great baseball game, the slow pace of play [...] and the dismal frame rate keep this game in the minors."

Notes

References

External links
 

1997 video games
Baseball video games
Interplay Entertainment games
PlayStation (console) games
Video games developed in the United States
Windows games